Slemmestad is a village in Røyken in Asker municipality in Viken, Norway. Slemmestad is located on the west bank of the Oslofjord, west of Oslo.

History
Historically Slemmestad was located on the old highway running between Oslo and Drammen.  Until the establishment of cement factory in 1892, this was a pure farming village.  The largest farms were the Lillelien, together with øvre and nedre  Slemmestad. Slemmestad  was built around the Aktieselskabet Christiania Portland Cementfabrik  cement plant.  Aktieselskabet Christiania Portland Cementfabrik, later Slemmestad sementfabrikk,  was in operation from 1893 to 1989. The company was for many years the principal  manufacturer of cement within Norway. The factory was rebuilt several times with new and more modern cement kilns. Cement production peaked in 1973, when it produced 1,082,677 tons.

Geography
Slemmestad forms part of the Oslo Geological Region (Oslofeltet). This is an ancient, sunken part of the crust reaching in the south at sea level and extending north to Brumunddal in the Ringsaker municipality of Hedmark County. By subsidence, the Oslo field had preserved a comprehensive sequence of shale, limestone, siltstone and sandstone of the Cambrian period.

Slemmestad Cement Museum
Slemmestad Cement Museum (Slemmestad Cementmuseum) is located in the cement factory's former bag factory in Slemmestad. The museum was opened in 1991. It features photographs, artifacts, records and other documentation that shows 100 years of development of cement production and the great importance of the factory was Slemmestad and the people who lived there.

Media
The newspaper Røyken og Hurums Avis was published in Slemmestad from 1976 to 2003.

Slemmestad Church
Slemmestad Church (Slemmestad kirke) is a wooden structure and has 200 seats.   It was dedicated on 25 August 1935. The architect for the church was Ivar Næss (1878–1936). The building was expanded eastward in 1960 with vestry and secondary rooms, and this extension was extended eastwards in 1978. Slemmestad chapel and cemetery are in the southern part of the village, around half kilometer from Slemmestad Church. The cemetery was inaugurated in autumn 1923.

Notable residents
Melissa Wiik, Footballer who plays for Urædd FK 
Bjørge Lillelien, Sports journalist

References

Other sources
Gartmann, Frithjof  (1990) Sement i Norge 100 år (Oslo) 
Søbye, Øystein  (1997)  Bak syv blåner (Oslo:  Orion forlag)

Villages in Viken (county)
Villages in Buskerud
Villages in Asker
Villages in Røyken
Røyken